Vira Viktorivna Halushka (Vira Viktorivna Halushka; born 3 February 1982), better known by her stage name Vera Brezhneva, is a Ukrainian singer, television presenter and actress.

Early life 

Vera Brezhneva was born on 3 February 1982 in Dniprodzerzhynsk, in the Ukrainian SSR of the Soviet Union. Her father, Viktor, worked in a chemical factory. Her mother, Tamara, a medical school graduate, worked in the same factory as Brezhneva's father. She has three sisters; one older sister named Halyna, and younger twins Nastya and Vika. She bought a flat for her parents in Boryspil, a town close to Kyiv. The father of Brezhneva's daughter, Sonia, is Vitaliy Voychenko, to whom Brezhneva was married to for a few years. She earned a degree by correspondence from the faculty of economics of the Dnepropetrovsk Institute of Railway Engineering.

Career

2002–2007: Nu Virgos (also known as "VIA Gra") 

In 2002, Brezhneva was invited to a casting organised to find a girl to replace Alena Vinnitskaya in the group Nu Virgos, in which she succeeded. In January 2003, Nu Virgos started performing in the new lineup; Nadiya, Anna and Vera, that, due to its massive popularity, gained the name of "the golden line up".

In July 2007, Brezhneva decided to take a break from the band. In December 2007, an official announcement was made stating that she was leaving Nu Virgos. She was then replaced in the group by Tatiana Kotova.

2008–2012: TV presenting and return to music 
Brezhneva was the presenter of the Russian version of the Power of 10 game-show called Магия 10-ти (lit. Magic of 10), which ran on Channel One Russia for two seasons from 7 January 2008 to 31 August 2008.

In May 2008, Brezhneva premiered her first single called "Ya ne igrayu" (Я не играю; I Don't Play). The song was written by her former producer Konstantin Meladze. The second single "Nirvana" was released on 27 October 2008. The third single "Ljubov v bolshom gorode" (Любовь в большом городе; Love in the Big City) was released in 2009. She then appeared in the music video for the song "Leto vsegda" (Лето всегда; Summer always) by the group Diskoteka Avariya, with actresses Anastasia Zadorozhnaya & Svetlana Khodchenkova. The fourth single was released in April; "Ljubov spasyot mir" (Любовь спасёт мир; Love will Save the World) and reached No. 1 in Russian Airplay Weekly. The next single "Pronto", a duet with Potap was released in September. Her sixth single "Lepestkami slyoz" (Лепестками слез; Petal Tears) was a duet with Dan Balan. In early 2011, Brezhneva premiered her new single "Realnaya zhizn" (Реальная жизнь; Real Life), and the single "Sexy Bambina" at the end of that year. In early 2012, the single "Ishu tebya" (Ищу тебя; Searching for You) was released.

Films 
Brezhneva has appeared in numerous Russian-language films. She played Katya in the film Love in the Big City (Любовь в большом городе) in 2009, and its two sequels in 2010 and 2013. In 2016, she starred in 8 Best Dates. She also had a major part playing as herself in Yolki (Ёлки) and Yolki 2, and also appeared in Jungle (Джунгли). Most of her film work has been in romantic comedies.

Discography

Singles

Albums
Studio albums
 Lyubov spasyot mir (2010)
 VERVERA (2015)

EP

 V. (2020)

Awards 
Vera Brezhneva has been the recipient of numerous awards, including the celebrated title of the "Woman of the Year" in Russia. She is considered one of the most beautiful women in Russia. In 2007, 2012, 2015, and 2016 she was named the sexiest woman in Russia by the men's magazine Maxim.

References

External links 
 Official website
 

1982 births
Living people
People from Kamianske
21st-century Ukrainian women singers
Ukrainian pop singers
English-language singers from Ukraine
Nu Virgos members
HIV/AIDS activists
Ukrainian film actresses
Ukrainian television presenters
Ukrainian women television presenters
Winners of the Golden Gramophone Award